Draženci is a village in the Municipality of Hajdina in northeastern Slovenia. The area is part of the traditional region of Styria. It is now included with the rest of the municipality in the Drava Statistical Region.

History
In 2005, the settlement of Lancova Vas pri Ptuju—formerly part of neighboring Lancova Vas—was annexed by Draženci.

Cultural heritage
Archaeological sites near the settlement are associated with the nearby Roman town of Poetovio.

References

External links
Draženci on Geopedia

Populated places in the Municipality of Hajdina